Theresa Ahearn (1 May 1951 – 20 September 2000) was an Irish Fine Gael politician who served as a Teachta Dála for the Tipperary South constituency from 1989 to 2000.

Political career 
Her first elected office was as a member of South Tipperary County Council from 1983 until 1999. Noted as a highly effective orator, she was elected to the 26th Dáil as a Fine Gael TD for Tipperary South at the 1989 general election, becoming the only female Fine Gael deputy representing a rural constituency in the Dáil. She was re-elected at the 1992 and the 1997 general elections.

She served as Fine Gael spokesperson on higher-education in 1991, at one time calling for the Dublin Institute of Technology to be granted the power to award their own degrees, stating "The colleges, in particular the DIT, at this stage rightly claim to have long experience of teaching to degree level... I suggest that now is the time to give the colleges this power to award their own degrees".

She was appointed as a Fine Gael spokesperson on Labour in 1992, and from 1992–1993 on Energy. She was the spokesperson on Women's Affairs and Chairperson of Oireachtas Committee on Women's Rights 1993–1995. She had been the Fine Gael Junior spokesperson on Equality and Disability since September 1997. Ahearn was a member of the Joint Committees on Foreign Affairs and on Justice, Equality and Women's Rights, and of the Committee on Procedure and Privileges.

Personal life 
Born Theresa Scott, in Waterford in 1951. She was a native of Golden, County Tipperary. She was educated at University College Dublin graduating with a Bachelor of Arts in History, Economics and Maths, and St Patrick's College, Maynooth with a Higher Diploma in Education, qualifying as a post-primary school teacher. Ahearn lived with her husband Liam Ahearn and family on the family farm near Clonmel, County Tipperary; her husband was a farmer.

Until her election to the Dáil, she taught mathematics at the Central Technical Institute, Clonmel.

Ahearn died of cancer on 20 September 2000 at Mount Carmel Hospital, Dublin, and was survived by her husband Liam and four sons. At the time of her death she was both a member of Fine Gael's National Executive Committee, and the first-ever female trustee of the party.

In the by-election after death, her Dáil seat in Tipperary South was retained for Fine Gael by Tom Hayes of Kilfeakle. She was the second TD in that constituency to die in 2000, the Labour Party's Michael Ferris having died on 20 March.

One of her sons, Garret Ahearn, was elected to Seanad Éireann in April 2020.

References

1951 births
2000 deaths
Fine Gael TDs
Members of the 26th Dáil
Members of the 27th Dáil
Members of the 28th Dáil
20th-century women Teachtaí Dála
21st-century women Teachtaí Dála
Local councillors in South Tipperary
Alumni of University College Dublin
Alumni of St Patrick's College, Maynooth
Deaths from cancer in the Republic of Ireland